The Yamaha Motif is a series of music workstation synthesizers, first released by Yamaha Corporation in August 2001. The Motif replaced the EX series in Yamaha's line-up and was also based on the early Yamaha S series. Other workstations in the same class are the Korg Kronos and the Roland Fantom G. The series' successor is Yamaha Montage.

Products

MOTIF Classic
Original MOTIF series, now called "MOTIF Classic", were released in four variants in 2001:

The balanced hammer effect action is the same action found on Yamaha S90 series keyboards.

MOTIF Rack is a sound module (with no keyboard) that is controlled by external MIDI instruments. It can be expanded with two Modular Synthesis Plug-in boards but has no sampling capabilities.

MM
In January (2007), Yamaha introduced two "retro" models; the MM6 (61 keys) and MM8 (88 keys), both based on the original 2001 Motif sound set and samples, with polyphony greatly reduced to fit the lower specifications. This synthesizer comes default with 418 patches and 22 drum kits.

GHS (Graded Hammer Standard) action is the same action on Yamaha's high end digital pianos.

MOTIF ES
MOTIF ES, a successor to original MOTIF series, debuted at Summer NAMM Show in 2003:

MO
In January 2006, Yamaha launched two entry-level variants of the MOTIF ES - the 61 key MO6 and 88 key MO8. Though containing half the polyphony and fewer preset sound programs, these models contain all the MOTIF ES sample sets, along with arpeggios and a song and pattern sequencer. Lacking are the professional MOTIF ES features such as mLAN connectivity, Yamaha PLG integration, sampling and multiple foot controllers.

MOTIF XS
The XS versions were announced at NAMM 2007:

MOTIF has a mLAN connection for transferring MIDI and sound to a PC.

The MOTIF XS operating system is based on MontaVista Linux.

MOX
In 2011, Yamaha introduced an entry-level variant of the MOTIF XS: the 61-key MOX6 and 88-key MOX8. Though containing half the polyphony and fewer insert effects of the XS, the MoX series contains all the MOTIF XS Wave ROM and voice presets, along with arpeggios and a song and pattern sequencer. The number of performances in the MoX is reduced to 256. The MoX does not support user sampling, nor does it support the mLAN/FireWire expansion. The MoX feature a built-in 4-out/2-in USB audio interface users can use to record audio directly from the keyboard or an outside source to a computer, as well as play and control VST instruments directly through the keyboard via USB.

MX
The current version of the entry-level Motif lineup, also based on the soundset of the Motif XS. It features the same voices as the XS, although with less WaveROM (166 MB vs. the XS's 355 MB), fewer performances (128), fewer arpeggios (999), and fewer editable parameters. The MX series also has no sequencer. It featured a similar USB audio/MIDI interface as the MoX series. The MX is playable in 16-part multi-timbral performance mode, configurable with the third-party Vycro editor. It is also the only keyboard in the Motif family available in a 49-key model (alongside the 61-key MX61).

A version with 88 GHS (Graded Hammer Standard) weighted keys, the MX88, was announced by Yamaha in April, 2017.

MOTIF XF
The XF versions were announced via www.MOTIFator.com on August 2, 2010:

While the preset voices in the MOTIF XF are the same as in the previous XS model, the XF includes an extra user bank containing 128 brand new voices. Also, eight new drum kits are also included in the user bank area. The biggest addition in the XF is the 512MB / 1024MB flash memory, which users can use to instantaneously import or load samples and sounds.
In 2014, Yamaha announced the 40th anniversary white versions of the MOTIF XF called the MOTIF XF WH Series, which are available for all three models—as MOTIF XF6, MOTIF XF7 & MOTIF XF8.

MOXF
In 2013, Yamaha launched two 'lite' versions of the MOTIF XF - the 61-key MoXF6 and 88-key MoXF8. The MoXF series contains all the MOTIF XF WaveROM, polyphony and voice presets, along with arpeggios and a song and pattern sequencer. The MoXF does not support on-board user sampling, nor does it support the mLAN/FireWire expansion. It features one slot for a flash memory board (versus 2 on the flagship XF), allowing users to load additional sample libraries from third-party sources. The MoXF also features the same USB MIDI/audio interface seen on the MoX series.

Specifications

Comparison

MOTIF Classic 
 AWM2 PCM tone generator
 110,000 note MIDI sequencer @ 480 ppqn
 Sample engine (4MB built-in, expandable up to 64MB of user RAM)
 Compatibility with common sample formats such as Akai, WAV, and AIFF
 84MB of read-only memory (ROM)
 62-voice polyphony

MOTIF keyboards include three internal expansion slots (two on the rack-mount version). These slots allow the user to augment the instrument's soundset through the purchase of Yamaha PLG Expansion Boards. The MOTIF Classic featured 4MB of onboard sampling RAM, which could be increased to 64MB with the purchase of third party memory sticks. External connectors include a FireWire 400 port for connecting an mLAN network card; a USB 1 port for connecting the instrument to a computer via a MIDI cable OR for external storage; and a SmartMedia port for storing sequence, voice, and sample data (which requires a third-party SmartMedia card).

MOTIF ES 
 AWM2 Tone Generator (complying with the Modular Synthesis Plug-in System)
 128 note polyphony
 226,000 note MIDI sequencer @ 480 ppqn
 Audio Input ports: A/D, AIEB2, mLAN, Stereo IN
 Sounds: 175MB (when converted to 16-bit linear format), 1,859 waveforms

All MOTIF ES synthesizers feature a selection of sounds, and use a sample-based subtractive synthesis engine. The MOTIF ES6, ES7 and ES8 feature 16 track sequencers that can use MIDI and sample tracks, and 512MB of sample memory can be fitted for completely new sounds. Physical modeling, virtual analogue synthesis, FM synthesis plus additional sample sets can be installed with Yamaha's Modular Synthesis Plug-in System (PLG boards).

The ES models featured several improvements over the original MOTIFs, including twice the polyphony with faster envelopes, a DSP effects engine (up to 8 tracks in sequencer mode can use independent dual insert effects), USB mass storage support, 8x sample RAM expansion (up to 512 MB via twin DIMM modules), improved acoustic piano sound, and twice the storage amount for user sounds.

The MOTIF ES range employs "Megavoice" technology from the Yamaha Tyros2. These samples utilise 'velocity switching', designed to enable greater natural expression over the sounds, expressions such as fret noise, hammer-ons, slides and ghost notes.

MOTIF XS 
 AWM2 Tone Generator
 128 note polyphony
 130,000 note MIDI sequencer @ 480 ppqn
 Connectors:
 Output L/R standard phone jack
 Assignable output standard phone jack
 A/D input
 Digital out (coaxial S/PDIF)
 Phones
 Foot controller 1,2
 Footswitch x 2 (Assignable, Sustain)
 MIDI In/Out/Thru
 USB 2.0 to Host, to Device
 AC In
 Ethernet
 mLAN (XS8 only, optional for XS6, 7)
 Sounds: 355MB (when converted to 16-bit linear format), 2,670 waveforms
Weighted Keys

Some improvements over the previous ES series were:
 Assignable AF1/AF2 buttons (Often defaulted to control XA)
 Larger color display
 Eight faders (four more than the ES)
 Up to eight elements (waveforms) per voice
 Expanded Articulation (XA) (e.g. being able to trigger a voice element at note-off to change the voice character)
 Ethernet connectivity
 Larger waveform ROM (more than double compared to the MOTIF ES)
 Up to 4 simultaneous arpeggios (in performance mode)
 Shipped with Cubase AI
 Direct performance recording to pattern

The MOTIF XS is not compatible with the Yamaha PLG expansion cards.

MOTIF XF 
 AWM2 Tone Generator
 128 note polyphony
 128MB internal SDRAM (sampling memory) standard
 130,000 note MIDI sequencer @ 480 ppqn
 Connectors:
 Output L/R standard phone jack
 Assignable output standard phone jack
 A/D input
 Digital out (coaxial S/PDIF)
 Phones
 Foot controller 1,2
 Footswitch x 2 (Assignable, Sustain)
 MIDI In/Out/Thru
 USB 2.0 to Host, to Device
 AC In
 Ethernet
 FW16E (optional FireWire connectivity)
 Optional 512MB and 1024MB FLASH cards for storage of sample data (2 GB combined max)
 Sounds: 741MB (when converted to 16-bit linear format), 3,977 waveforms
 Weighted Keys

An improvement over the MOTIF XS is the use of non-volatile flash memory for samples and sample libraries. Instead of DIMM memory modules, the XF uses proprietary flash cards. While more expensive than DIMM modules, the flash cards can permanently store sample data. The volatile DIMM modules in previous models could not store data when the unit powered off. Once initially loaded into the XF, the user doesn't have to reload sample data every time they power up the keyboard. The MOTIF XF is also the first in the MOTIF series since the MOTIF Classic to have standard internal SDRAM for sampling built into the keyboard.

As with the MOTIF XS, the MOTIF XF is not compatible with the PLG expansion cards.

Notable users of the keyboard include Stevie Wonder, Thomas Dolby, Gary Numan, Ron Mael, Billy Currie, Craig Burrows, Alan Parsons, John Foxx, George Duke and Mark Ronson.

Timeline of series

See also 
 Yamaha PSR-3000
 Yamaha S90, Yamaha S90ES, Yamaha S90XS - (all use the Motif series engine)
 Yamaha MM6
 Yamaha MO

References

External links 
 Motifator.com
 
Yamaha Motif XS Series Keyboard Review at yamahamusician.com
 Yamaha Motif ES simplified operation tutorial 

  (AWM versus AWM2)

Music workstations
Motif
Polyphonic synthesizers
Digital synthesizers